His Very Best is a 1980 compilation album by Willie Nelson.

Track listing
Stardust - 3:50
Blue Eyes Crying In The Rain - 2:17
Me And Bobby McGee - 5:13
I Love You A Thousand Ways - 2:57
All Of Me - 3:52
Help Me Make It Through The Night - 3:57
Georgia On My Mind - 4:17
Red Headed Stranger - 3:58
If You've Got The Money, I've Got The Time - 2:03
Whiskey River - 2:45
Mammas Don't Let Your Babies Grow Up To Be Cowboys - 3:27
Blue Skies - 3:31
Good Hearted Woman - 2:52
Medley:Funny How Time Slips Away/Crazy/Night Live - 8:31
Remember Me - 2:49
September Song - 4:32
Heartbreak Hotel - 3:00
I'm A Memory - 1:55
Uncloudy Day - 4:38
Amazing Grace - 5:39

1980 compilation albums
Willie Nelson compilation albums
Columbia Records compilation albums